Noga is a surname. It may refer to:

 Al Noga (born 1965), American football player
 Artur Noga (born 1988), Polish hurdler
 Niko Noga (born 1962), American football player
 Paulo Noga (born 1980), Portuguese footballer
 Pete Noga (born 1964), American football player

See also
 

Polish-language surnames